Kang Chil-ku (born August 8, 1984), also spelled Kang Chil-gu, is a South Korean ski jumper who has competed since 2001. He finished eighth in the team large hill and 46th in the individual normal hill events at the 2002 Winter Olympics in Salt Lake City.

Kang finished 30th in the individual event of the 2002 Ski-flying World Championships at Harrachov. His best World Cup finish was 29th in a large hill event in Finland in 2003.

Kang's lone career victory was in a normal hill event at an FIS Race in Italy in 2003.

External links

1984 births
Ski jumpers at the 2002 Winter Olympics
Living people
Ski jumpers at the 2006 Winter Olympics
Ski jumpers at the 2014 Winter Olympics
South Korean male ski jumpers
Olympic ski jumpers of South Korea
Asian Games medalists in ski jumping
Ski jumpers at the 2003 Asian Winter Games
Ski jumpers at the 2011 Asian Winter Games
Asian Games gold medalists for South Korea
Asian Games bronze medalists for South Korea
Medalists at the 2003 Asian Winter Games
Medalists at the 2011 Asian Winter Games
21st-century South Korean people